William Wilson (January 7, 1884 – October 28, 1925) was a professional baseball pitcher. He appeared in one game in Major League Baseball in 1906 for the Washington Senators. He made his lone appearance on the last day of the season, October 3, pitching a seven-inning complete game against the Boston Americans and losing, 2-1.

External links

Major League Baseball pitchers
Washington Senators (1901–1960) players
Terre Haute Hottentots players
Canton Chinamen players
Milwaukee Brewers (minor league) players
Minneapolis Millers (baseball) players
Baseball players from Columbus, Ohio
1884 births
1925 deaths